Duane Andrews (born November 30, 1972 in Carbonear, Newfoundland and Labrador is a Canadian guitarist.  He combines traditional Newfoundland folk music with jazz similar to the way that guitarist Django Reinhardt infused jazz with Manouche influences. He is also a composer for film and television.

Biography

Born in Carbonear, Newfoundland and Labrador, Canada Andrews grew up exposed to the island’s mélange of cultural influences and his development as a guitarist reflects that. After graduating from the Jazz Studies program at St. Francis Xavier University with honours, Andrews spent several years studying contemporary music composition at the Conservatoire International de Paris and at the Conservatoire National de Region in Marseille, France.

Discography
2004: Self Titled
2006: Crocus
2008: Raindrops
2010: Dwayne Côté and Duane Andrews with Dwayne Cote
2012: The Empress with Dwayne Cote
2013: Charlie's Boogie with Craig Young
2015: Conception Bay
2015: More Sheep, Less Sleep with The Swinging Belles
2015: The Mallard Cottage Sessions with Aaron Collis
2016: Jingle Belles with The Swinging Belles
2016: Fretboard Journey with Fretboard Journey  
2018: Christmas Picks with Fretboard Journey 
2018: The Superstar Sibling Detective Agency with The Swinging Belles

References

External links
www.duaneandrews.ca official website
www.theswingingbelles.ca The Swinging Belles

Living people
1972 births
Canadian people of English descent
Canadian folk guitarists
Canadian male guitarists
Canadian jazz guitarists
Canadian record producers
Musicians from Newfoundland and Labrador
Independent Music Awards winners
People from Carbonear
Canadian Folk Music Award winners
21st-century Canadian guitarists
21st-century Canadian male musicians
Canadian male jazz musicians